Álvaro Navarro Serra (Faura, 1973), simply known as Álvaro, is one of the main Valencian pilota professional players. He is one of the most reputed dauers due to his strong left hand and his professionality, and has got to be a member of the Valencian Pilota Squad. Now he is one of the stars of the ValNet company.

Álvaro began playing Galotxa variant, but he is mostly known by his Escala i corda career, where he is the absolute ruler, both in Circuit Bancaixa teams and in Trofeu Individual Bancaixa one-on-one matches.

On 2001 Álvaro led the Valencian Pilota Squad in the European Championship hold in the Netherlands, where the Valencians won the frontó and International game. He has also tripped to the Basque Country to play against renowned Basque pilotaris such as Agirre.

On October 9, 2005, Álvaro was awarded with the Golden Medal for Sports efforts by Francesc Camps, the president of the Generalitat Valenciana.

Trophies 
 Winner of the Trofeu el Corte Inglés 1992
 Winner of the Circuit Bancaixa 1997, 2001 and 2002
 Runner-up of the Circuit Bancaixa 1996, 2000, 2003 and 2006
 11 Winner of the Trofeu Individual Bancaixa 1998, 2001, 2002, 2003, 2004, 2005, 2006 , 2007...

 Runner-up of the Individual Trofeu Individual Bancaixa 1995 and 2000

Handball International Championships
 Winner of the European Frontó and International game Championship, Netherlands 2001
 Runner-up of Llargues, Netherlands 2001
 Winner of the World Frontó, International game and Llargues Championship, Argentina 2002
 Winner of the World Llargues Championship, Italy 2004
 Runner-up of Frontó and International game, Italy 2004

References

External links 
 Alvaro at ValNet 
 Vídeos:
 Últims jocs de la final de l'Individual d'Escala i Corda del 95 contra Genovés I
 Final de l'Individual d'Escala i Corda de 2004 contra Genovés II, partida completa
 Ecuador'08, Frontó internacional: Selecció valenciana contra Ecuador

1973 births
Living people
People from Camp de Morvedre
Sportspeople from the Province of Valencia
Pilotaris from the Valencian Community